Weiwoboa is an extinct genus of weiwoboid fulgoroid which existed in what is now China during the early Eocene period. It was named by Lin Qibin, Jacek Szwedo, Huang Diying and Adam Stroiński in 2010, and the type species is Weiwoboa meridiana.

References

Prehistoric insect genera
†
Eocene insects
Fossil taxa described in 2010
Cenozoic insects of Asia
Extinct Hemiptera